Chappel & Wakes Colne railway station is on the Gainsborough Line, a branch to  off the Great Eastern Main Line, in the East of England, serving the village of Wakes Colne and the neighbouring Chappel. Its three-letter station code is CWC. Platform 1 has an operational length for five-coach trains. Platforms 2 and 3 are used by the East Anglian Railway Museum.

The station is currently operated by Greater Anglia, who also operate all trains serving it, as part of the East Anglia franchise.  It has one platform as the line is single-track. It is also home to the East Anglian Railway Museum which has the former London-bound platform, a running line, the original station buildings and all of the land and facilities on the east side of the line. Just to the south of the station the line runs over the Chappel viaduct. 

Chappel & Wakes Colne is unstaffed but has a self-service ticket machine. The platform buildings, on the station's west side, are restored to 1950s style but are part of the museum, and entered from ground-floor level.

History

The 1861 census shows Samuel Hamblin as the resident station-master. He appears to have fallen foul of the railway authorities at some stage as he is shown working in Poplar as an engine driver in the 1871 census. The 1871 census records 29-year-old Alfred H. Bryant as the resident station-master. The 1881 census shows 45-year-old George William Grand as the station-master, a position he held until at least 1891.

Chappel Viaduct
Built at a cost of £32,000 it contains seven million bricks. The 1851 census records that a foreman bricklayer and several labourers were living in huts adjacent to the viaduct. The vast majority of the bricks had been manufactured on-site using local clay.

Services 
The typical off-peak service is one train per hour in each direction, with frequency increased slightly during the peak. The last train of the day continues to Colchester.

In popular culture
This station was used as a filming location in two scenes for the 2013 film The Numbers Station, starring John Cusack.

References

External links

History page at Subterranea Britannica
East Anglian Railway Museum website
Chappel Parish Council website
Website of the village and railway
Chappel and Wakes Colne station on navigable 1946 O. S. map

 

Railway stations in Essex
DfT Category F2 stations
Former Great Eastern Railway stations
Railway stations in Great Britain opened in 1849
Greater Anglia franchise railway stations
1849 establishments in England
William Neville Ashbee railway stations